"Gabonia massiliensis"  is a Gram-negative, anaerobic and non-spore-forming bacterium from the genus "Gabonia" which has been isolated from human faeces.

References 

Bacteroidia
Bacteria described in 2015